Oxenton is a village and civil parish  north east of Gloucester, in the Tewkesbury district, in the county of Gloucestershire, England. In 2011 the parish had a population of 162. The parish touches Alderton, Ashchurch Rural, Gotherington, Teddington and Stoke Orchard. It is on the west side of Oxenton Hill, a northern outlier of the Cotswolds. Oxenton has a parish meeting.

Landmarks 
There are 22 listed buildings in Oxenton. Oxenton has a church called St John the Baptist and a village hall.

History 
The name "Oxenton" means 'Ox hill'. Oxenton was recorded in the Domesday Book as Oxendone. On 1 April 1935 Woolstone parish was abolished and merged with Oxenton.

References 

Villages in Gloucestershire
Civil parishes in Gloucestershire
Borough of Tewkesbury